Félix "René" Lasserre (9 October 1895 – 19 August 1965) was a French rugby union player who competed in the 1924 Summer Olympics. He was born in Bayonne and died in Saint-Avold. In 1924 he won the silver medal as member of the French team.

References

1895 births
1965 deaths
French rugby union players
Olympic rugby union players of France
Rugby union players at the 1924 Summer Olympics
Olympic silver medalists for France
France international rugby union players
Medalists at the 1924 Summer Olympics
Sportspeople from Bayonne